Immortals or Persian Immortals was the name given by Herodotus to an elite heavy infantry unit of 10,000 soldiers in the army of the Achaemenid Empire. The unit served in a dual capacity through its role as imperial guard alongside its contribution to the ranks of the Persian Empire's standing army. While it primarily consisted of Persians, the Immortals force also included Medes and Elamites. Essential questions regarding the historic unit remain unanswered because authoritative sources are missing.

Herodotus' account

Herodotus describes the Immortals as being heavy infantry led by Hydarnes the Younger; it provided the professional corps of the Persian armies and was kept constantly at a strength of exactly 10,000 men. He stated that the unit's name stemmed from the custom that every killed, seriously wounded, or sick member was immediately replaced with a new one, maintaining the corps as a cohesive entity with a constant strength.

The Persian denomination of the unit is uncertain. This elite force is only referred to as the "Immortals" in sources based on Herodotus. There is evidence of the existence of a permanent corps from Persian sources, which provided a backbone for the tribal levies who made up the bulk of the Achaemenid armies; however, these do not record the name of "Immortals".

History

They also notably participated in the Battle of Thermopylae in 480 BCE during the Greco-Persian Wars and were amongst the Persian troops who occupied Greece in 479 BCE under Mardonius.

During the final decades of the Achaemenid Empire, the role expected of the Immortals'  was extended to include that of chief minister to the King of Kings. The provision of a bodyguard, in direct attendance of the monarch, had already been allocated to a select thousand-strong detachment of the unit.

Equipment

Xenophon describes the guard of Cyrus the Great as having bronze breastplates and helmets, while their horses wore chamfrons and peitrels of bronze together with shoulder pieces which also protected the rider's thighs. Herodotus instead describes their armament as follows: wicker shields covered in leather, short spears, quivers, swords or large daggers, slings, bows and arrows. They wore scale armour coats. The spear counterbalances of the common soldiery were of silver; to differentiate commanding ranks, the officers' spear butt-spikes were of gold. The regiment was followed by a caravan of covered carriages, camels, and mules that transported their supplies, along with concubines and attendants to serve them; this supply train carried special food that was reserved only for their consumption.

The headdress worn by the Immortals is believed to have been the Persian tiara. Its actual form is uncertain, but some sources describe it as a cloth or felt cap which could be pulled over the face to keep out wind and dust in the arid Persian plains. Surviving Achaemenid coloured glazed bricks and carved reliefs represent the Immortals as wearing elaborate robes, hoop earrings and gold jewellery, though these garments and accessories were most likely worn only for ceremonial occasions.

Legacy

Sasanian Empire

The first re-occurrence of the word "Immortals" is in Roman historians' description of an elite cavalry unit in the army of the Sasanian Empire. Primary sources suggest that they numbered around 10,000 men in accordance with tradition, with the main formational difference being that they were heavy cavalry. However, recent scholarship has doubted the Roman description of the force, including their name, their size, and that they were modeled on the Achaemenid Immortals, although there may have been one or more of such distinct elite cavalry units during the Sasanian period. Their task was mainly to secure any breakthroughs and to enter battles at crucial stages.

Byzantine Empire

The designation "Immortal" to describe a military unit was used twice during the era of the Byzantine Empire: first as elite heavy cavalry under John I Tzimiskes and then later under Nikephoritzes, the chief minister of Byzantine emperor Michael VII Doukas, as the core of a new central field army following the disastrous Byzantine defeat at Manzikert to the Seljuk Turks in 1071.

French Empire

During the 19th-century Napoleonic Wars, many French soldiers referred to Napoleon's Imperial Guard as "the Immortals".

Imperial State of Iran

Under Mohammad Reza Pahlavi, the last Shah of Iran, the Imperial Iranian Army included an all-volunteer known as the Javidan Guard, named after the ancient Persian royal guard. The Javidan Guard was based at the Lavizan Barracks in Tehran. By 1978, this elite force comprised a brigade of 4,000–5,000 men, including a battalion of Chieftain tanks. Following the 1979 Islamic Revolution that ended the Imperial State of Iran and the Pahlavi dynasty, the "Immortal Guard" was disbanded.

Islamic Republic of Iran 

The signature shield of the Achaemenid Empire's Immortals has been adopted in the insignia of the 65th Airborne Special Forces Brigade and the 55th Airborne Brigade of the Islamic Republic of Iran Army.

In popular culture
Herodotus' account of two warrior elites—the hoplites of Sparta and the Immortals of Persia—facing each other in battle has inspired a set of rather colourful depictions of the battle, especially in regard of the Immortals:

In the 1962 film The 300 Spartans, the Immortals carry a spear and wicker shields like the actual Immortals. However, they are mostly dressed in black and other dark colors in contrast to historical depictions.
Frank Miller's 1998 comic book 300 and the 2006 feature film adapted from it present a heavily fictionalized version of the Immortals at the Battle of Thermopylae in 480 BCE. These Immortals wear Mengu-style metal masks, appear to be inhuman or disfigured, and carry a pair of swords closely resembling Japanese wakizashis.
The History Channel's 2007 film Last Stand of the 300 also features the Immortals as part of the reconstruction of the historic battle at Thermopylae in ancient Greece. In this version, the Persian tiara that the Immortals habitually wore is depicted as a full-face black cloth mask transparent enough to see through.

See also

 History of Iran
 Military history of Iran

References

Sources

Military units and formations of the Achaemenid Empire
Royal guards
Battle of Thermopylae
Combat occupations
Infantry units and formations